Matewa Media is a New Zealand production company that dubs Disney animated films into the Māori language.

Productions

Moana Reo Māori (2017)

Matewa Media was formed by Tweedie Waititi and Chelsea Winstanley in 2017 after seeing how popular the 2016 film Moana was with Winstanley's children. With the help of Waititi's cousin and Winstanley's husband Taika Waititi, who wrote the initial screenplay of Moana and was at the time working on Thor: Ragnarok, they secured the dubbing rights from Disney. They received funding from Disney, Air New Zealand, and Te Māngai Pāho who gave $160,000. It was announced in June 2017, with high school student Jaedyn Randell and Te Kāea newsreader Piripi Taylor cast as the lead roles of Moana and Maui respectively, while Rachel House, Temuera Morrison, and Jemaine Clement reprised their roles from the English version. A total of 250 people auditioned for the role of Moana. House also served as the performance director, while Rob Ruha was the musical director.

The film premiered on 11 September 2017, during Te Wiki o te Reo Māori. It was screened for free in thirty cinemas around the country, with no English subtitles. The soundtrack was released in November 2017, and the film launched on the Disney+ streaming service on 26 June 2020.

The Lion King Reo Māori and Frozen Reo Māori (2022)

Māori dubs of the 1994 film The Lion King and the 2013 film Frozen were announced in July 2021, with Matewa Media getting $500,000 in funding from NZ On Air to produce them in December 2021.

The cast of The Lion King Reo Māori was announced in May 2022, with Mataara Stokes as Simba, Arihia Cassidy as Nala, Piripi Taylor as Mufasa, Matu Ngaropo as Scar, and Matai Rae and Justin Rogers as Timon and Pumbaa respectively. Each group of animals speak their own Māori dialect from five different iwi; the lions are Waikato Tainui, the hyenas are Ngāti Kahungunu, Timon and Pumbaa are Te Tai Tokerau Māori, Zazu is Taranaki, and Rafiki is Ngāi Tūhoe. Matewa Media appealed directly to Elton John for permission to dub his version of "Can You Feel the Love Tonight" in the closing credits, becoming the first foreign version of the film to do so. Stan Walker performed the cover. The film released on 21 June 2022, with the premiere attended by the Māori King Tūheitia Paki.

The cast of Frozen Reo Māori was announced in September 2022, with Jaedyn Randell as Anna, Awhimai Fraser as Elsa, Kawiti Waetford as Kristoff, James Tito as Hans, and Pere Wihongi as Olaf. Due to the colder climate, the film is in the dialect of Ngāi Tahu. The film premiered on 26 October 2022.

Both films launched on Disney+ in November 2022.

Future projects
At the premiere of Frozen Reo Māori, Waititi announced that the 2021 film Encanto and the 2017 film Coco were next. Matewa Media secured another $500,000 in funding from NZ On Air to produce them in December 2022, and the release of Coco Reo Māori was set for Matariki 2023.

References

Dubbing studios
New Zealand companies established in 2017
Mass media companies established in 2017
Mass media companies of New Zealand
Māori-language mass media
Disney animation